The Muglad Basin is a large rift basin in Northern Africa. It contains a number of hydrocarbon accumulations of various sizes, the largest of which are the Heglig and Unity oil fields. During the 1960s and 1970s, Chevron made the first oil discoveries in the basin near the towns of Bentiu, Malakal, and Muglad. Taken together, the Muglad and Melut rift basins account for the majority of Sudan's known oil reserves.

The oil fields of the Muglad Basin are connected to Port Sudan on the Red Sea by the Greater Nile Oil Pipeline which begins at the Unity oil field. Oil extracted in Muglad is known as "Nile Blend" crude. It is refined at Khartoum for export and domestic consumption. Further oil exploration in the Muglad Basin commenced in February 2008.

See also

References

External links
 African Oil Journal: Sudan

Aulacogens
Geology of Sudan
Geology of South Sudan
Oil fields of Sudan
Sedimentary basins of Africa